Red Circle may refer to:

 Red Circle (law firms), a group of elite Chinese law firms 
 Red Circle (publishing), Martin Goodman's group of pulp magazine publishing corporations
 Red Circle (typeface) a typeface based on the c. 1930 packaging of A&P coffees
 Red Circle Coffee, a brand sold by the American grocery chain A&P
 Red Circle Comics, now Dark Circle Comics, an Archie Comics imprint
 The Red Circle (serial), a 1915 American silent film serial
 Le Cercle Rouge (lit. The Red Circle), a 1970 French crime film

See also
 "The Adventure of the Red Circle", a Sherlock Holmes story
 Red Circle Authors, a British publishing house that specialises in Japanese fiction